The 1965–66 Western Kentucky Hilltoppers men's basketball team represented Western Kentucky University during the 1965-66 NCAA University Division Basketball season. The Hilltoppers were led by Ohio Valley Conference Coach of the Year John Oldham and OVC Player of the Year Clem Haskins.  WKU won the OVC tournament and season championship, as well as the conference's automatic bid to the 1966 NCAA University Division basketball tournament, where they advanced to the Sweet Sixteen and finished 3rd in the Mideast Region.  The conference tournament was held in December and had no impact on the conference standing; the conference NCAA tournament bid was awarded to the season champion.

This team was the recipient of what many Hilltopper fans referred to as “the worst call in NCAA tournament history.”  In the second-round game against Michigan, Western Kentucky forced a jump ball with seconds left, while leading by 1 point.  Western Kentucky's Greg Smith was called for a foul during the jump and Michigan's Cazzie Russell made two free throws to win the game.  Still pictures show Russell not jumping on the play and then leaning in to make contact with Smith.

Haskins was joined on the All-Conference and OVC Tournament teams by Steve Cunningham, Dwight Smith, and Greg Smith

Schedule

|-
!colspan=6| Regular Season

|-

 
|-
!colspan=6| 1966 NCAA University Division basketball tournament

References

Western Kentucky Hilltoppers basketball seasons
Western Kentucky
Western Kentucky
Western Kentucky Basketball, Men's
Western Kentucky Basketball, Men's